Atalacmea fragilis is a species of sea snail or true limpet, a marine gastropod mollusc in the family Lottiidae, one of the families of true limpets.

Distribution
This marine species occurs off New Zealand.

References

Zoologie, vol. 2(1), p. 471 p., 16 pls
 Powell A. W. B., William Collins Publishers Ltd, Auckland 1979 

Lottiidae
Gastropods of New Zealand
Gastropods described in 1823
Taxa named by George Brettingham Sowerby I